The 2017 SMP F4 Championship is the third season of the SMP F4 Championship. The series is also known as FIA North-European Zone (NEZ) championship.

Among the team partaking in the championship are SMP Racing (who have been partaking in the series since its inception), MP Motorsport, in its second season, and debutants FA Racing Team, ALM Motorsport, Lappalainen Racing Team and AKK Academy.

Despite more teams running the cars, the so-called single-operation remains. All cars have identical set-up including tyre pressure.

The series is a FIA North-European Zone (NEZ) championship and drivers must hold a valid annual license issued by one of the NEZ ASNs to score points. NEZ Council, however, agreed in its meeting in 30 November 2016 to allow KNAF license holders to score points in the championship again in 2017 season. The exception is valid for 2017 season only and Dutch drivers aren't eligible to any other NEZ cups or championships.

Several drivers outside North-European Zone and the Netherlands hold licenses issued by zone ASNs and are allowed to score points: Guillem Pujeu and Xavier Lloveras represent Finland (AKK Motorsports), Gülhüseyn Abdullayev Russia (RAF) and Lukas Dunner Netherlands (KNAF).

Drivers

Race calendar

Championship standings

Points are awarded to the top 10 classified finishers in each race. No points are awarded for pole position or fastest lap.

Drivers' Championship

References

External links

SMP F4 Championship seasons
SMP F4 Championship
SMP F4 Championship
SMP F4
SMP F4